Ánimo South Los Angeles Charter High School (also known as "ASLA", or "Animo South LA") is a public charter school operated by Green Dot Public Schools of Los Angeles.

History
Ànimo South Los Angeles Charter High School was founded by Green Dot Public Schools and established in August 2004.  The first graduating class graduated in 2008. It is accredited by the Western Association of Schools and Colleges through June 30, 2014.

Animo South Los Angeles was founded in response to the dangerous circumstances surrounding Washington Preparatory High School, one of Los Angeles's most troubled schools. According to the Los Angeles Times, in the 2000–2001 school year, thirty five percent of Washington Prep students were suspended, far passing district-wide suspension rates of thirteen percent. Not only were test scores and academic performance extremely poor, but the campus itself was so unsafe that in 2002, the teachers filed a written complaint to their union, calling the school "out of control" and demanding increased security on campus. Reports were released that the school was plagued by drugs, violence, and sex. Since Animo South LA was formed in 2004, students at this school have a safe place to go to where they can learn. Animo South LA has outperformed Washington High School in statewide API scores by over 150 points.

Animo South LA's graduation rate is 81%. 90% of Graduating seniors are accepted into college, 79% attend college

July 22, 2014, Fire
On the afternoon of Tuesday July 22, 2014, around 2:17 pm LAFD received a call reporting a fire in a High School near Western and Imperial. Reportedly the fire started with an AC malfunction. According to Los Angeles County Fire inspector Scott Miller, the School's roof, and exterior wall collapsed. 2 Firefighters were injured by the fire; they reportedly went inside to see if there were people in need of help. The fire made national news and the fire was seen in all of Los Angeles. One of Green Dot's first schools, Animo South just celebrated its 10th anniversary when the fire happened.

Courses

9th 
 English 9 or ELD/ESL
 Read 180 or 9th Grade Composition
 Algebra 1 or Algebra 1 Honors
 Math Support or Geometry Honors
 Biology 
 Ethnic studies or Academic Success
 PE

10th
 English 10
 Composition or AEE
 Geometry or Integrated Math
 Spanish 1 Non Native or Spanish 2 Native Speakers
 Anatomy/Physiology
 World history or AP World History
 College Readiness 10 (CAHSEE Prep) or Academic Success

11th
 English 11 or AP English Language
 Drama 
 Precalculus or Algebra 2 or Geometry
 Spanish 2 Non Native or Spanish 3 Native Speakers or AP Spanish Language
 Chemistry
 US History or AP US History
 College Readiness 11 (College Spring) or Academic Success

12th
 English 12 or AP English Literature
 ERWC or ELA Elective or Film and Composition
 Trigonometry or Algebra 2 or AP Statistics
 Spanish 3 Non Native or AP Spanish Language or Academic Success
 Environmental Science or APEX Chemistry
 Government/Economics 
 College Readiness 12 (Career Readiness/College Prep) or LASWC

Animo also offers Advanced Placement courses. They include
 AP Biology 
 AP English Language and Composition 
 AP United States Government and Politics 
 AP Spanish Literature 
 AP Spanish Language 
 AP United States History 
 AP World History
 AP Statistics
Animo's AP student Participation rate is 56%, and its passing rate is 55%.

Awards and recognition 
In 2013, Animo South LA was ranked the 801st best high school in the United States and 162nd in California.

In 2012 and 2013, U.S. News & World Report ranked Animo South LA as a Silver Medal School.

Student demographics 
As of the school year 2012–13, there were a total of 537 students attending the high school.

55.6% Hispanic (299)
43.3% Black (233)
0.5% Other (3)
0.3% White (2)
57% Female (305)
43% Male (232)

School Scores

CAHSEE

CAHSEE pass percentages accounted only for 10th graders.

API

Athletics 
The school competes in the CIF Southern Section of the California Interscholastic Federation (CIF) association and offers the following sports:
 Football (boys)
 Soccer (boys, girls)
 Basketball (boys, girls)
 Softball (girls)
 Baseball (boys)
 Track and Field (boys, girls)
 Cheerleading (girls)

On March 3, 2012, the Boys Basketball team won the 2012 CIF Los Angeles City Small Schools Boys Basketball Section championship vs Viewpark High with a score of (49–47).
Also in 2012 the Girls soccer team made it to the Playoffs the first time in the school's history

Notable alumni
 Corey Fowler (Smoove Da General), recording artist. member of Cali Swag District, creator of Teach Me How to Dougie.
 Jose Anthony Dheming, Salvadorian Footballer who plays for Chivas USA Academy and the El Salvador U-20 National Football Team.

References

 http://www.maxpreps.com/high-schools/02hIEXcutkSbUVZIbou-mg/animo-south-los-angeles-panthers/home.htm
 http://www.greendot.org/schools/school_descriptions
 http://www.animosouthla.org/index.php?option=com_content&task=view&id=3&Itemid=7

External links
 Official website
 ASLA panthers Flickr
 ASLA Max Preps
 Green Dot

Further reading
  "Incendio destruye preparatoria" (Archive). La Opinión. July 23, 2014.

Charter high schools in California
Educational institutions established in 2004
High schools in Los Angeles County, California
Green Dot Public Schools
2004 establishments in California